Josefin Nordlöw (born 1982) is a Swedish sprint canoer who competed in the late 2000s to 2010s. She won two bronze medals at the ICF Canoe Sprint World Championships (K-2 500 m: 2009, K-4 200 m: 2006).

Nordlöw's home club is Vårby IK in Örnsköldsvik.

References
Canoe09.ca profile

Svenska kanotförbundet: Landslagsaktiva 

1982 births
Living people
Swedish female canoeists
Canoeists at the 2012 Summer Olympics
Olympic canoeists of Sweden
ICF Canoe Sprint World Championships medalists in kayak